Andre Anura Anuar (born 12 June 1999) is a Malaysian ahlete.

Early life and background
Andre was born on 12 Jun 1999 in Tenom, Sabah, Malaysia. He attended the Malaysian Sports School in Sepanggar.

Athletics career 
He started his career at the ages of 16 in 2015 ASEAN School Games when he achieved 2nd in Long jump.

In 2019 , Andre stole the focus after breaking Josbert Tinus's 12-year long jump record with a jump of 8.02 metres (m) to win a silver medal in 2019 Southeast Asian Games. The record, which saw Andre delete a previous record of 7.88m by Josbert Tinus at the Thai CDI Bangkok Open Championship in October 2007.

References

External links 

  profile at World Athletics

Living people
Malaysian male long jumpers
Malaysian people of Malay descent

1999 births
Malaysian male athletes
Competitors at the 2019 Southeast Asian Games
Southeast Asian Games silver medalists for Malaysia
Southeast Asian Games gold medalists for Malaysia
20th-century Malaysian people
21st-century Malaysian people